Ragnhild Vassvik Kalstad (born 21 June 1966 in Gamvik) is a Norwegian politician for the Labour Party.

She served as a deputy representative to the Parliament of Norway from Finnmark during the term 2009–2013. From 2012 to 2013 she served in Stoltenberg's Second Cabinet as a State Secretary in the Ministry of Government Administration, Reform and Church Affairs  Following the 2015 elections, Kaltad became the new deputy county mayor (fylkesvaraordfører) of Finnmark, being promoted to county mayor in 2017 when Runar Sjåstad was elected to Parliament. Kalstad had formerly been a member of Karasjok municipal council.

References

1966 births
Living people
People from Gamvik
People from Karasjok
Norwegian Sámi politicians
Deputy members of the Storting
Norwegian state secretaries
Chairmen of County Councils of Norway
Labour Party (Norway) politicians
Norwegian women in politics
Women members of the Storting